Jalalvand-e Sofla (also Romanized as Jalālvand-e Soflá; also known as Jalālvand-e Pā’īn and Javālvand-e Soflá) is a village in Beshiva Pataq Rural District, in the Central District of Sarpol-e Zahab County, Kermanshah Province, Iran. At the 2006 census, its population was 239, in 52 families.

References 

Populated places in Sarpol-e Zahab County